Comet West, formally designated C/1975 V1, 1976 VI, and 1975n, was a comet described as one of the brightest objects to pass through the inner Solar System in 1976. It is often described as a "great comet."

History 
It was discovered photographically by Richard M. West, of the European Southern Observatory, on August 10, 1975. The comet came to perihelion (closest approach to the Sun) on February 25, 1976. During perihelion the comet had a minimum solar elongation of 6.4° and as a result of forward scattering reached a peak apparent magnitude of −3. From February 2527, observers reported that the comet was bright enough to study during full daylight.

Despite its brightness, Comet West went largely unreported in the popular media. This was partly due to the relatively disappointing display of Comet Kohoutek in 1973, which had been widely predicted to become extremely prominent: scientists were wary of making predictions that might raise public expectations.

Period
With a nearly parabolic trajectory, estimates for the orbital period of this comet have varied from 254,000 to 558,000 years. Computing the best-fit orbit for this long-period comet is made more difficult since it underwent a splitting event which may have caused a non-gravitational perturbation of the orbit. The 2008 SAO Catalog of Cometary Orbits shows 195 observations for C/1975 V1 and 135 for C/1975 V1-A, for a combined total of 330 (218 observations were used in the fit).

Breakup 
Before the perihelion passage, and using 28 positions obtained between 1975 August 10 and 1976 January 27, Comet West was estimated to have an orbital period of about 254,000 years. As the comet passed within 30 million km of the Sun, the nucleus was observed to split into four fragments.

The first report of the split came around 7 March 1976 12:30UT, when reports were received that the comet had broken into two pieces. Astronomer Steven O'Meara, using the 9-inch Harvard Refractor, reported that two additional fragments had formed on the morning of 18 March.

The fragmentation of the nucleus was, at the time, one of very few comet breakups observed, one of the most notable previous examples being the Great Comet of 1882, a member of the Kreutz Sungrazing 'family' of comets. More recently, comets Schwassmann-Wachmann-3 (73P), C/1999 S4 LINEAR, and 57P/du Toit-Neujmin-Delporte, have been observed to split or disintegrate during their passage close to the Sun.

Nomenclature 
In the nomenclature of the time, it was known as Comet 1976 VI or Comet 1975n, but the modern nomenclature is C/1975 V1. (Note that "1976 VI" uses the Roman numeral VI = 6, while "C/1975 V1" is the letter V and the number 1).

See also

List of Solar System objects by greatest aphelion

References

External links 
 

Non-periodic comets
19750810
Great comets